Chalus Road or Kandovan Road, also known as the Road 59 is an important road for people of Tehran and Karaj, many of whom drive to popular tourist attractions in the north of Iran on weekends and for holidays.
This road is one of the busiest in Iran.
There is a tunnel in this road that is called Kandovan. The Kandovan tunnel was built in four years from 1935 to 1939.

References

External links
 Chalus Road، Tishineh

Roads in Iran